Angelo Emo or simply Emo was the name of at least two ships of the Italian Navy named in honour of Angelo Emo and may refer to:

 , a  launched in 1919 and discarded in 1930.
 , a  launched in 1938 and sunk in 1942.

Italian Navy ship names